Pursuit Channel is an American television network that airs programming geared to hunting, fishing, shooting and outdoor recreation. It is based in Glenwood, Alabama and was launched on April 23, 2008.

Pursuit is currently available to over 45 million cable and satellite homes and customers, along with web and digital media player availability. The network's schedule mainly is made up of brokered programming purchased in blocks by producers of outdoor programming, or by companies advertising their products as part of the sponsorship of those programs.

In January 2013, Anthem Sports & Entertainment purchased a "significant ownership stake" in Pursuit Media. Since January 11, 2019, Anthem's professional wrestling property, Impact Wrestling has been airing its weekly television series on Pursuit. After Anthem acquired a controlling interest in AXS TV on September 9, 2019, Impact! was later announced to be moving to AXS on Tuesday nights beginning in October of that year.

References

External links
 

Anthem Sports & Entertainment
Sports television networks in the United States
English-language television stations in the United States
Fishing in the United States
Hunting in popular culture
Television channels and stations established in 2008
2008 establishments in Alabama